Darlington Hall is a heritage listed building in Darlington, Western Australia.

History
The original structure was a built for the nineteenth century Darlington Winery in 1890 for Alfred Waylen and Josceline Amherst.

It was renovated a number of times over the years.

It is now called Darlington Hall, and a part is home to the Darlington Club. The building is registered with the Heritage Council of Western Australia.

The original structure is known as the lesser hall, while the more recent larger section on the west side is the main hall.

Current uses
A large number of local groups and people have used the space for meetings and private events. The Darlington Theatre players (now the  Marloo Theatre) had their first plays performed in the hall, and it hosts the art exhibition of the annual Darlington Arts Festival.

The hall has been used by the Darlington Progress Association (now the Darlington Rate Payers Association) since the 1920s.

It has been the location of the annual Darlington Concerts - also known as the Darlington Chamber Music Series.

Notes

Further reading
 Elliott, I., Mundaring, A History of the Shire, Mundaring, 1983 
 Wiltshire, T., A Place in the Hills, Darlington's First Fifty Years, Darlington, 1997 
 Spillman, K., Life was meant to be here, Mundaring, 2003. 

Heritage places in Perth, Western Australia
Darlington, Western Australia